Paw Paw Branch is a  long 2nd order tributary to Providence Creek in New Castle County, Delaware.

Course
Paw Paw Branch rises on the Black Stallion Ditch divide about 0.1 miles northeast of Reynolds Corners, Delaware.

Watershed

See also
List of rivers of Delaware

References 

Rivers of Delaware
Rivers of New Castle County, Delaware
Tributaries of the Smyrna River